Mehar Chand Dhawan was an Indian sprinter and triple jumper. He placed 14th in the triple jump and was eliminated in the first round of the 4 × 100 m relay competition at the 1932 Summer Olympics.

References

External links
 

Indian male triple jumpers
Indian male sprinters
1912 births
Date of death unknown
Olympic athletes of India
Athletes (track and field) at the 1932 Summer Olympics
Athletes from Himachal Pradesh